Safi Al-Zaqrati (born 19 April 1999) is a Saudi Arabian footballer who plays as a striker.

Career
Al-Zaqrati is an academy graduate of Al-Ahli. He was first called up to the first team in December 2018 in the league match against Al-Wehda. On 20 October 2020, Al-Zaqrati joined Al-Fayha on loan. On 28 July 2021, Al-Zaqrati joined Al-Nahda on loan. On 17 January 2023, Al-Zaqrati joined Jeddah.

Honours

International
Saudi Arabia U19
 AFC U-19 Championship: 2018

References

External links
 

1999 births
Living people
Saudi Arabian footballers
Saudi Arabia youth international footballers
Association football forwards
Saudi Professional League players
Saudi First Division League players
Al-Ahli Saudi FC players
Al-Fayha FC players
Al-Nahda Club (Saudi Arabia) players
Jeddah Club players